"LSI (Love Sex Intelligence)" is a song by Scottish band the Shamen with vocals by Jhelisa Anderson. Having been remixed by the Beatmasters, it was the first single taken from their fifth album, Boss Drum (1992). Released in July 1992, it achieved success in Finland, where it reached number one, Sweden, where it peaked at number four, and the United Kingdom, where it rose to number six. On the Eurochart Hot 100, "LSI" peaked at number 16. The CD single also contains a remix of "Make It Mine", a song from the En-Tact album.

Critical reception
Larry Flick from Billboard wrote, "Wildly popular British rave act previews its upcoming U.S. sophomore set, Boss Drum, with an NRGetic workout that is splashed with acidic keyboard lines and pouty female vamping." Andy Kastanas from The Charlotte Observer found that "This has the ravish flavour of the Shamen's music with some additional female vocals thrown in for texture. Don't miss the house, techno, and break beat versions." Linda Ryan from the Gavin Report called it a "high-energy, no-apologies dance track". She stated that Jhelisa Anderson's vocal talent "is the ace-in-the-hole here, and this siren makes "LSI" move in a really big way." A reviewer from Melody Maker reckoned that the raps "are as strong as those" of "Move Any Mountain".

Andy Beevers from Music Week described the song as "intelligent acidic techno". Roger Morton from New Musical Express writing, "Clean as a whistle, the Shamen's first single of '92 pulses along flashing polished technology and irrefutable slogans. It's a piece of seamless, aerobic '90s pop automation that would do very nicely as a soft drink commercial theme". Another editor stated that "this should push the Shamen back into the charts." Johnny Dee from Smash Hits gave it five out of five, commenting, "LSI? Love, Sex, Intelligence if you're interested. And you will be, 'cos, like "Move Any Mountain", this is a corkin' Hi-NRG anthem that snaps at your heels like an annoying Yorkshire Terrier and demands you dance. Odd folk but they know a cuffin' good groove when it tweaks their ear-lobes."

Music video
The music video for the song was directed by Mathew Glamorre.

Track listings

7" single
Europe
 "LSI" (Beat Edit) — 3:45
 "LSI" (Alternative Edit) — 3:45

12" maxi

Australia
 "LSI" (Freaked Out V1.02)
 "LSI" (Club Deep Mix)
 "LSI" (Dance Vocal)
 "Possible Worlds"
 "LSI" (Dub Rave Vocal)

Germany
 "LSI" (Dance Vocal) — 5:12
 "Possible Worlds" — 3:27
 "LSI" (Freaked Out V1.02) — 5:13
 "LSI" (Club Deep Mix) — 11:25

Denmark, France, UK
 "LSI" (Freaked Out V1.02) — 5:13
 "LSI" (Club Deep Mix) — 11:25
 "LSI" (Dance Vocal) — 5:12
 "Possible Worlds" — 3:27

US
 "LSI" (Ed Richards 12" Mix) — 5:11
 "LSI" (Beatmasters 12" Mix) — 5:14
 "LSI" (Shamen Alternative Vocal) — 6:06
 "LSI" (Frank De Wulf Dub Rave) — 4:29
 "LSI" (Shamen Deep Dub) — 6:00
 "LSI" (Well Hung Parliament Dub) — 5:41

CD maxi

Europe
 "LSI" (Beat Edit) — 3:45
 "LSI" (Alternative Vocal) — 6:06
 "LSI" (Dub Rave Vocal) — 4:37
 "Make It Mine" (U.S. Dub Mix) — 4:25

US
 "LSI" (Beatmasters 7") — 3:40
 "LSI" (Shamen 7") — 3:51
 "LSI" (E-Smoove 7" Mix) — 3:35
 "LSI" (Ed Richards 12" Mix) — 5:11

Charts

Weekly charts

Year-end charts

References

1992 singles
Number-one singles in Finland
The Shamen songs
1992 songs
Virgin Records singles
One Little Independent Records
Rough Trade Records singles